Fire on the Mountain may refer to:

Music
 "Fire on the Mountain," a traditional Old Time fiddle tune dating to at least the early 19th century
"Fire on the Mountain," an instrumental recording of the fiddle tune by Theron Hale and Daughters in 1928
Fire on the Mountain (album), a 1974 album by Charlie Daniels
"Fire on the Mountain" (The Marshall Tucker Band song), a song on the 1975 album, Searchin' for a Rainbow
"Fire on the Mountain" (Grateful Dead song), a 1978 song by the Grateful Dead
"Fire on the Mountain", a song on the 2007 album The Walk by Hanson
"Fire on the Mountain", an instrumental by The 2010 Vancouver Olympic Orchestra played at the 2010 Winter Olympics opening ceremony

Literature and film
Fire on the Mountain, a chapter in the 1954 debut novel Lord of the Flies by Nobel Prize-winning author William Golding
Fire on the Mountain, a 1962 novel by Edward Abbey
Fire on the Mountain, a 1981 television movie adaptation of the Edward Abbey novel
Fire on the Mountain, a 1977 novel by Anita Desai
Fire on the Mountain, a 1988 novel by Terry Bisson
Fire on the Mountain, a 1994 illustrated alternate history fiction book by Jane Kurtz
Fire on the Mountain, a 1996 documentary about the 10th Mountain Division of World War II
Fire on the Mountain, a 1999 non-fiction book by John Norman Maclean

Flora
Euphorbia cyathophora, a member of the Euphorbia genus of plants

Games
Fire on the Mountain (game), a game played by children in Tanzania and in some parts of South Africa